The Rebirth of the Social Democratic Party (RPSD) (Rénaissance du Parti Social-Démocratique) is a political party in Madagascar. 
At the legislative elections, 15 December 2002, the party won 2.0% of the popular vote and 5 out of 160 seats. Since the 23 September 2007 National Assembly elections it is no longer represented in parliament.

References

Political parties in Madagascar
Social democratic parties